Cerio can refer to:

People
 Edwin Cerio, a prominent Italian writer, engineer, architect, historian, and botanist.
 Ferruccio Cerio,  an Italian film writer and director
 Ignazio Cerio,  an influential but eccentric physician and amateur philosopher on the island of Capri, in Italy
 Iñigo Díaz de Cerio, a Spanish retired footballer who played as a striker
 Nicholas Raymond Cerio, an American martial artist
 Steven Cerio,  an American artist, filmmaker, musician, writer, and composer

Places
 Cerio, a village in Álava, Basque Country, Spain